Asian Youth Day (AYD) is an international Catholic event organized by the Federation of Asian Bishops' Conferences, Office of Laity & Family, Youth Desk and the host country. The event, which is held every three years, brings together Catholic youths from all over Asia. The event is similar to World Youth Day.

The week long gathering enables Asian youth to experience the Gospel with others of different cultures and how the modern world celebrates the Gospel, and how it applies to current issues like social justice, leadership among its youth.  The week festivities include prayer, forums, and workshops.  The event is used to enrich, inspire, and renew the spiritual lives of Catholic youth of Asia.

History 
In 1991, during the fifth World Youth Day in Czestochowa, Poland, delegates from numerous Asian countries expressed their desire to create a network and various channels of their own, to inspire the Catholic youth on the Asian continent.

In 1993, a youth consultation conference was held in Bangkok, Thailand. Participating youth representatives at the conference suggested that a youth working group be formed as a parish-based subsidiary of the Federation of Asian Bishops’ Conferences in an effort to gather support for youth leaders within the organization and to enhance mutual cooperation and links among youth parish groups from Asian countries.

The Youth Desk was officially established in 1994. Since its opening, the team has successfully organized a series of activities for Asian youths and youth leaders, including the Asian Youth Gathering during the World Youth Day, Asian Youth Ministers’ Meeting and Asian Youth Day.

See also

World Youth Day
Catholic spirituality
Catholic youth work
Eucharistic Congress
Fellowship of Catholic University Students
International Federation of Catholic Parochial Youth Movements (Fimcap)
International Youth Day
International Youth Year
Life Teen
Universal call to holiness
Vocational Discernment in the Catholic Church
Youth 2000

References 

Catholic youth organizations
Youth events
Christian festivals and holy days